Yandina railway station is located on the North Coast line in Queensland, Australia. It serves the town of Yandina in the Sunshine Coast Region.

History
Yandina station opened on 30 December 1890, serving as the line's terminus for a period.

The North Coast line through the area was completed in 1891. However a station office building wasn't operational until a while later. The station today consists of one platform with a wooden structure. Opposite the platform lies a passing loop and a Queensland Rail engineering depot.

Services
Yandina is serviced by two daily City network services in each direction.

Services by platform

Transport links
Sunbus' route 631 Noosa Junction to Nambour station serves Yandina station.

References

External links

Yandina station Queensland Rail
Yandina station Queensland's Railways on the Internet

North Coast railway line, Queensland
Railway stations in Sunshine Coast, Queensland
Railway stations in Australia opened in 1890